The House of Mowbray was an Anglo-Norman noble house, derived from Montbray in Normandy and founded by Roger de Mowbray, son of Nigel d'Aubigny.

Foundations

Following the Norman conquest of England, Geoffrey de Montbray, bishop of Coutances, was granted some 280 English manors. His heir, his brother Roger's son, Robert de Mowbray, Earl of Northumbria, was forfeited and imprisoned for life on rebelling in 1095.  His lands were confiscated and he was forced to divorce his wife, Matilda de L'Aigle, daughter of Richer, Lord of L'Aigle.  His Mowbray lands would be granted to her new husband, a royal favourite, Nigel d'Aubigny.

Nigel d'Aubigny was son of Roger d'Aubigny (of Saint-Martin-d'Aubigny) and with his brother William was an ardent supporter of Henry I. The brothers were rewarded with great estates in England. William was made king's butler, and was father of William d'Aubigny, 1st Earl of Arundel; Nigel was rewarded with marriage to the former the wife of the imprisoned Robert de Mowbray, and with the escheated Norman fief of her former husband, also being give a number of lands in England.  After a decade of childless marriage, he would divorce Matilda and remarry in 1118 to Gundred de Gournay (died 1155), daughter of Gerard de Gournay, lord of Gournay.  They had one son by that marriage, Roger, who would inherit from his father the Mowbray lands in Normandy and take the Mowbray surname.Roger, a great lord with a hundred knight's fees, was captured with King Stephen at the battle of Lincoln, joined the rebellion against Henry II (1173), founded abbeys, and went on crusade. His grandson William, a leader in the rising against King John, was one of the 25 barons of the Magna Carta, as was his brother Roger, and was captured fighting against Henry III at the rout of Lincoln (1217).

Lords Mowbray

William's grandson Roger de Mowbray (1266–1298), was summoned to parliament by Edward I, by which act he is held to have become the first Lord Mowbray.  He was father of John (1286–1322), a warrior and warden of the Scottish March, who, joining in Thomas of Lancaster's revolt, was captured at Boroughbridge and hanged.  His wife, a Braose heiress, added Gower in South Wales and the Bramber lordship in Sussex to the great possessions of his house. Their son John de Mowbray, 3rd Baron Mowbray (d. 1361) was father, by Joan of Lancaster, a daughter of Henry, 3rd Earl of Lancaster, of John, Lord Mowbray (c. 1328–1368), whose fortunate alliance with the heiress of John de Segrave, 4th Baron Segrave, by the heiress of Edward I's son Thomas, earl of Norfolk and marshal of England, crowned the fortunes of his race. In addition to a vast accession to their lands, the earldom of Nottingham and the marshalship of England were bestowed on them by Richard II, and the dukedom of Norfolk followed.

The 1st duke left two sons, of whom Thomas the elder was only recognized as earl marshal. Beheaded for joining in Scrope's conspiracy against Henry IV (1405), he was succeeded by his brother John, who was restored to the dukedom of Norfolk in 1424. His son John, the third duke, was father of John, 4th and last duke, who was created earl of Warenne and Surrey in his father's lifetime (1451). At his death (1481) his vast inheritance devolved on his only child Anne, who was married as an infant to Edward IV's younger son Richard (created duke of Norfolk and earl of Nottingham and Warenne), but died in 1481.

The next heirs of the Mowbrays were then the Howards and the Berkeleys, representing the two daughters of the first duke. Between them were divided the estates of the house, the Mowbray dukedom of Norfolk and earldom of Surrey being also revived for the Howards (1483), and the earldom of Nottingham (1483) and earl marshalship (1485) for the Berkeleys. Both families assumed the baronies of Mowbray and Segrave, but Henry Howard was summoned in his father's lifetime (1640) as Lord Mowbray, which was deemed a recognition of the Howards' right; their co-heirs, from 1777, were the Lords Stourton and the Lords Petre, and in 1878 Lord Stourton was summoned as Lord Mowbray and Segrave. The former dignity is claimed as the premier barony, though De Ros ranks before it. Lord Stourton's son claimed, but unsuccessfully, in 1901–1906 the earldom of Norfolk (1312), also through the Mowbrays. Of the Mowbray estates the castle and lordship of Bramber is still vested in the dukes of Norfolk.

The current Baron of Mowbray is James Stourton, 28th Baron Mowbray, 29th Baron Segrave and 25th Baron Stourton (2021–present).

Notable Mowbray family members

Nigel d'Aubigny, lord of Mowbray (d.1129)
Roger de Mowbray, lord of Mowbray (d.1188)
William de Mowbray, lord of Mowbray (d.ca.1224)
Roger de Mowbray, 1st Baron Mowbray (d.1298)
John de Mowbray, 2nd Baron Mowbray (d.1322)
John de Mowbray, 3rd Baron Mowbray (d.1361)
John de Mowbray, 4th Baron Mowbray (d.1368)
John Mowbray, 1st Earl of Nottingham, 5th Baron Mowbray (d.1383)
Thomas Mowbray, 1st Duke of Norfolk, Earl of Nottingham and Norfolk, Baron Segrave and 6th Baron Mowbray (d.1399)
Thomas Mowbray, 4th Earl of Norfolk, Earl of Nottingham, Baron Segrave and 7th Baron Mowbray (d.1405)
John Mowbray, 2nd Duke of Norfolk, Earl of Norfolk, Baron Segrave and 8th Baron Mowbray (d.1432)
John Mowbray, 3rd Duke of Norfolk, Earl of Nottingham and Norfolk, Baron Segrave and 9th Baron Mowbray (d.1461)
John Mowbray, 4th Duke of Norfolk, Earl of Nottingham, Norfolk, Surrey and Warenne, Baron Segrave and 10th Baron Mowbray (d.1476)
Anne de Mowbray, 8th Countess of Norfolk, Baroness  Segrave and 11th Baroness Mowbray (d.1481)

Tree of House of Mowbray

Notes

References
Oxford Dictionary of National Biography, Oxford University Press:
 Hugh M. Thomas, “Mowbray, Sir Roger (I) de (d. 1188)”, 2004
 James Tait, revised by Hugh M. Thomas, “Mowbray, William de (c.1173–c.1224)”, online version, October 2005
 Rowena E. Archer, “Mowbray, John (I), second Lord Mowbray (1286–1322)”, online version, January 2008
 Rowena E. Archer, “Mowbray, John (II), third Lord Mowbray (1310–1361)”, 2004
 Rowena E. Archer, “Mowbray, John (III), fourth Lord Mowbray (1340–1368)”, online version, January 2008
 Rowena E. Archer, “Mowbray, John (V), second duke of Norfolk (1392–1432)”, online version, January 2008
 Rowena E. Archer, “Mowbray, Thomas (II), second earl of Nottingham (1385–1405)”, online version, January 2008
Attribution:

Further reading
Greenway, D.E. (ed.), Charters of the Honour of Mowbray 1107–1191, London, 1972

External links
 Coat-of-arms, Mowbray, St James' Church, High Melton, Yorkshire, Flickr.com

Mowbray
Anglo-Normans
Mowbray family